Zhangmutou (formerly Cheung Muk Tou) is a railway station that serves the town of Zhangmutou in Dongguan City, Guangdong Province, China.  It is a stop on the Guangzhou–Shenzhen railway.

History 
On 1 January 2009, a new square was opened adjacent to the station.

From 10 April 2021, the number of services calling at Zhangmutou was reduced and the destinations were limited to Guangzhou and Shenzhen. However, from 25 June, services levels were increased again.

References

External links

Buildings and structures in Dongguan
Railway stations in Guangdong
Stations on the Beijing–Kowloon Railway
Stations on the Guangzhou–Shenzhen Railway